Edward Birge may refer to:

 Edward Asahel Birge (1851–1950), professor and administrator at the University of Wisconsin–Madison
 Edward Bailey Birge (1868–1952), founding member of the Music Supervisors National Conference